Andrew Rakić (born 1 December 1980) is an Australian former professional footballer who played as a defender or midfielder

References

External links
 Oz Football profile
 

1980 births
Living people
Australian people of Croatian descent
Sportspeople from Canberra
Soccer players from the Australian Capital Territory
Australian soccer players
Association football defenders
Australia international soccer players
National Soccer League (Australia) players
Sydney United 58 FC players
Canberra Cosmos FC players
NK Zagreb players
Kickers Offenbach players
SV Eintracht Trier 05 players
FC Victoria Rosport players
Australian expatriate soccer players
Australian expatriate sportspeople in Germany
Expatriate footballers in Germany
Australian expatriate sportspeople in Croatia
Expatriate footballers in Croatia
Australian expatriate sportspeople in Luxembourg
Expatriate footballers in Luxembourg